Milton Harris may refer to:

Milton Harris (professor), American economist at The University of Chicago Booth School of Business
Milton Harris (scientist) (1906–1991), founder of the Harris Research Laboratories and former chairman of the National Academy of Sciences Board of Directors
Milton E. Harris (1927–2005), Canadian businessman and founder of the Harris Steel Group